Chrysodeixis celebensis is a moth of the family Noctuidae. It is found on Sulawesi.

External links
Chrysodeixis at funet

Plusiinae